Oversight may refer to:

Governance 
Regulation – rulemaking
Separation of powers in state governance (checks and balances) - the concept of separate branches of government or agencies exercising authority over one another
Checks and controls over a particular body or institution:
Congressional oversight over U.S. federal agencies and other institutions, exercised by the United States Congress
The ministry of episcopal oversight within Christian churches
Oversight over the International Federation of Accountants (IFAC), see Public Interest Oversight Board
Oversight (registration, inspection, standard setting and enforcement) over auditors, see Public Company Accounting Oversight Board
Internal oversight over United Nations operations, see United Nations Office of Internal Oversight Services
An element of organizational governance, see Fair governance

Sports 
Oversight (horse), a French Thoroughbred racehorse